The women's 200 metres event at the 2013 Asian Athletics Championships was held at the Shree Shiv Chhatrapati Sports Complex on 6–7 July.

Medalists

Results

Heats
First 2 in each heat (Q) and 2 best performers (q) advanced to the final.

Wind: Heat 1: -0.2 m/s, Heat 2: +0.4 m/s, Heat 3: +0.2 m/s

Final
Wind: -0.6 m/s

References
Results

200 Women's
200 metres at the Asian Athletics Championships
2013 in women's athletics